Mathilde-Amivi Petitjean (born February 19, 1994) is a French-Togolese cross-country skier. She competed for Togo at the 2014 Winter Olympics in the 10 km classical race. Petitjean finished in 68th place in her only race out of 75 competitors, nearly ten minutes behind the winner Justyna Kowalczyk of Poland. Petitjean hopes that her appearance will help to inspire the youth of Africa to participate in winter sports.

Petitjean was born in Togo, to a Togolese mother which allowed her the opportunity to compete for the country. She was contacted by Togolese Ski Federation in March 2013 via Facebook to compete for the country at the Winter Olympics. Petitjean has lived the majority of her life in Haute-Savoie, France, where she learned to ski.

She carried the Togolese flag at the opening ceremony.

She competed for France until her switch to compete for Togo.

Cross-country skiing results
All results are sourced from the International Ski Federation (FIS).

Olympic Games

World Championships

World Cup

Season standings

See also
Togo at the 2014 Winter Olympics

References

External links
 

1994 births
Living people
People from Kpalimé
Sportspeople from Haute-Savoie
Togolese female cross-country skiers
French female cross-country skiers
Togolese people of French descent
French sportspeople of Togolese descent
Olympic cross-country skiers of Togo
Cross-country skiers at the 2014 Winter Olympics
Cross-country skiers at the 2018 Winter Olympics
Université Savoie-Mont Blanc alumni